Seo Hyo-Sun (born 20 September 1966) is a South Korean former field hockey player who competed in the 1988 Summer Olympics.

References

External links
 

1966 births
Living people
South Korean female field hockey players
Olympic field hockey players of South Korea
Field hockey players at the 1988 Summer Olympics
Olympic silver medalists for South Korea
Olympic medalists in field hockey
Asian Games medalists in field hockey
Field hockey players at the 1986 Asian Games
Asian Games gold medalists for South Korea
Medalists at the 1986 Asian Games
Medalists at the 1988 Summer Olympics
20th-century South Korean women
21st-century South Korean women